A bromoxylene is an aromatic compound containing a benzene ring linked with two methyl groups, and a bromine atom. There are several isomers.

Bromoarenes